June Yvonne Clarke (born March 21, 1935 in Barbados) is a Barbadian diplomat. She was the High Commissioner of Barbados to Canada from 1996 until 1999 and Permanent Representative of Barbados to the United Nations in New York from 1999 until 2004.  In 1998, Clarke became the Non-Resident High Commissioner of Barbados to New Zealand.

From 2002-03, she was Vice-President of the General Assembly of the United Nations.

Biography
Clarke attended Queen's College (Barbados). Clarke was Chief Executive Officer of Women and Development Ltd. before becoming High Commissioner to New Zealand after had a career in life insurance.

References

High Commissioners of Barbados to Canada
Barbadian women ambassadors
High Commissioners of Barbados to New Zealand
Women chief executives
1935 births
Permanent Representatives of Barbados to the United Nations
Queen's College (Barbados) alumni
Living people